The 2019–20 Supertaça de Angola (30th edition) was contested by Primeiro de Agosto, the 2018–19 Girabola champion and Desportivo da Huíla, the 2018–19 Angola Cup winner, in the return of the two leg format. On home court. D'Agosto beat Desportivo 2–0 to secure their 10th title, following a 0-1 defeat in the first leg match in Lubango.

Match details

First Leg

Second Leg

See also
 2019 Angola Cup
 2018–19 Girabola
 Primeiro de Agosto players
 Desportivo da Huíla players

References

Supertaça de Angola
Super Cup